Tyrosine hydroxylase or tyrosine 3-monooxygenase is the enzyme responsible for catalyzing the conversion of the amino acid L-tyrosine to L-3,4-dihydroxyphenylalanine (L-DOPA). It does so using molecular oxygen (O2), as well as iron (Fe2+) and tetrahydrobiopterin as cofactors. L-DOPA is a precursor for dopamine, which, in turn, is a precursor for the important neurotransmitters norepinephrine (noradrenaline) and epinephrine (adrenaline). Tyrosine hydroxylase catalyzes the rate limiting step in this synthesis of catecholamines. In humans, tyrosine hydroxylase is encoded by the TH gene, and the enzyme is present in the central nervous system (CNS), peripheral sympathetic neurons and the adrenal medulla. Tyrosine hydroxylase, phenylalanine hydroxylase and tryptophan hydroxylase together make up the family of aromatic amino acid hydroxylases (AAAHs).

Reaction 

Tyrosine hydroxylase catalyzes the reaction in which L-tyrosine is hydroxylated in the meta position to obtain L-3,4-dihydroxyphenylalanine (L-DOPA). The enzyme is an oxygenase which means it uses molecular oxygen to hydroxylate its substrates. One of the oxygen atoms in O2 is used to hydroxylate the tyrosine molecule to obtain L-DOPA and the other one is used to hydroxylate the cofactor. Like the other aromatic amino acid hydroxylases (AAAHs), tyrosine hydroxylase use the cofactor tetrahydrobiopterin (BH4) under normal conditions, although other similar molecules may also work as a cofactor for tyrosine hydroxylase.

The AAAHs converts the cofactor 5,6,7,8-tetrahydrobiopterin (BH4) into tetrahydrobiopterin-4a-carbinolamine (4a-BH4). Under physiological conditions, 4a-BH4 is dehydrated to quinonoid-dihydrobiopterin (q-BH2) by the enzyme pterin-4a-carbinolamine dehydrase (PCD) and a water molecule is released in this reaction. Then, the NAD(P)H dependent enzyme dihydropteridine reductase (DHPR) converts q-BH2 back to BH4. Each of the four subunits in tyrosine hydroxylase is coordinated with an iron(II) atom presented in the active site. The oxidation state of this iron atom is important for the catalytic turnover in the enzymatic reaction. If the iron is oxidized to Fe(III), the enzyme is inactivated.

The product of the enzymatic reaction, L-DOPA, can be transformed to dopamine by the enzyme DOPA decarboxylase. Dopamine may be converted into norepinephrine by the enzyme dopamine β-hydroxylase, which can be further modified by the enzyme phenylethanol N-methyltransferase to obtain epinephrine. Since L-DOPA is the precursor for the neurotransmitters dopamine, noradrenaline and adrenaline, tyrosine hydroxylase is therefore found in the cytosol of all cells containing these catecholamines. This initial reaction catalyzed by tyrosine hydroxylase has been shown to be the rate limiting step in the production of catecholamines.

The enzyme is highly specific, not accepting indole derivatives - which is unusual as many other enzymes involved in the production of catecholamines do. Tryptophan is a poor substrate for tyrosine hydroxylase, however it can hydroxylate L-phenylalanine to form L-tyrosine and small amounts of 3-hydroxyphenylalanine. The enzyme can then further catalyze L-tyrosine to form L-DOPA. Tyrosine hydroxylase may also be involved in other reactions as well, such as oxidizing L-DOPA to form 5-S-cysteinyl-DOPA or other L-DOPA derivatives.

Structure

Tyrosine hydroxylase is a tetramer of four identical subunits (homotetramer). Each subunit consists of three domains. At the carboxyl terminal of the peptide chain there's a short alpha helix domain that allows tetramerization. The central ~300 amino acids make up a catalytic core, in which all the residues necessary for catalysis are located, along with a non-covalently bound iron atom. The iron is held in place by two histidine residues and one glutamate residue, making it a non-heme, non-iron-sulfur iron-containing enzyme. The amino terminal ~150 amino acids make up a regulatory domain, thought to control access of substrates to the active site. In humans there are thought to be four different versions of this regulatory domain, and thus four versions of the enzyme, depending on alternative splicing, though none of their structures have yet been properly determined. It has been suggested that this domain might be an intrinsically unstructured protein, which has no clearly defined tertiary structure, but so far no evidence has been presented supporting this claim. It has however been shown that the domain has a low occurrence of secondary structures, which doesn't weaken suspicions of it having a disordered overall structure. As for the tetramerization and catalytic domains their structure was found with rat tyrosine hydroxylase using X-ray crystallography. This has shown how its structure is very similar to that of phenylalanine hydroxylase and tryptophan hydroxylase; together the three make up a family of homologous aromatic amino acid hydroxylases.

Regulation 

Tyrosine hydroxylase activity is increased in the short term by phosphorylation. The regulatory domain of tyrosine hydroxylase contains multiple serine (Ser) residues, including Ser8, Ser19, Ser31 and Ser40, that are phosphorylated by a variety of protein kinases. Ser40 is phosphorylated by the cAMP-dependent protein kinase.  Ser19 (and Ser40 to a lesser extent) is phosphorylated by the calcium-calmodulin-dependent protein kinase.  MAPKAPK2 (mitogen-activated-protein kinase-activating protein kinase) has a preference for Ser40, but also phosphorylates Ser19 about half the rate of Ser40. Ser31 is phosphorylated by ERK1 and ERK2 (extracellular regulated kinases 1&2), and increases the enzyme activity to a lesser extent than for Ser40 phosphorylation. The phosphorylation at Ser19 and Ser8 has no direct effect on tyrosine hydroxylase activity. But phosphorylation at Ser19 increases the rate of phosphorylation at Ser40, leading to an increase in enzyme activity. Phosphorylation at Ser19 causes a two-fold increase of activity, through a mechanism that requires the 14-3-3 proteins. Phosphorylation at Ser31 causes a slight increase of activity, and here the mechanism is unknown. Tyrosine hydroxylase is somewhat stabilized to heat inactivation when the regulatory serines are phosphorylated.

Tyrosine hydroxylase is mainly present in the cytosol, although it also is found in some extent in the plasma membrane. The membrane association may be related to catecholamine packing in vesicles and export through the synaptic membrane. The binding of tyrosine hydroxylase to membranes involves the N-terminal region of the enzyme, and may be regulated by a three-way interaction between 14-3-3 proteins, the N-terminal region of tyrosine hydroxylase, and negatively charged membranes.

Tyrosine hydroxylase can also be regulated by inhibition. Phosphorylation at Ser40 relieves feedback inhibition by the catecholamines dopamine, epinephrine, and norepinephrine. The catecholamines trap the active-site iron in the Fe(III) state, inhibiting the enzyme.

It has been shown that the expression of tyrosine hydroxylase can be affected by the expression of SRY. The down regulation of the SRY gene in the substantia nigra can result in a decrease in tyrosine hydroxylase expression.

Long term regulation of tyrosine hydroxylase can also be mediated by phosphorylation mechanisms. Hormones (e.g. glucocorticoids), drugs (e.g. cocaine), or second messengers such as cAMP increase tyrosine hydroxylase transcription. Increase in tyrosine hydroxylase activity due to phosphorylation can be sustained by nicotine for up to 48 hours. Tyrosine hydroxylase activity is regulated chronically (days) by protein synthesis.

Clinical significance 
Tyrosine hydroxylase deficiency leads to impaired synthesis of dopamine as well as epinephrine and norepinephrine. It is represented by a progressive encephalopathy and poor prognosis. Clinical features include dystonia that is minimally or nonresponsive to levodopa, extrapyramidal symptoms, ptosis, miosis, and postural hypotension. This is a progressive and often lethal disorder, which can be improved but not cured by levodopa. Due to the low number of patients and overlapping symptoms with other disorders, early diagnosis and treatment remain challenging. Response to treatment is variable and the long-term and functional outcome is unknown. To provide a basis for improving the understanding of the epidemiology, genotype/phenotype correlation and outcome of these diseases, their impact on the quality of life of patients, and for evaluating diagnostic and therapeutic strategies, a patient registry was established by the noncommercial International Working Group on Neurotransmitter Related Disorders (iNTD). 

Furthermore, alterations in the tyrosine hydroxylase enzyme activity may be involved in disorders such as Segawa's dystonia, Parkinson's disease and schizophrenia. Tyrosine hydroxylase is activated by phosphorylation dependent binding to 14-3-3 proteins. Since the 14-3-3 proteins also are likely to be associated with neurodegenerative diseases such as Alzheimer's disease, Parkinson's disease and Huntington's disease, it makes an indirect link between tyrosine hydroxylase and these diseases. The activity of tyrosine hydroxylase in the brains of patients with Alzheimer’s disease has been shown to be significantly reduced compared to healthy individuals. Tyrosine hydroxylase is also an autoantigen in Autoimmune Polyendocrine Syndrome (APS) type I.

A consistent abnormality in Parkinson's disease is degeneration of dopaminergic neurons in the substantia nigra, leading to a reduction of striatal dopamine levels. As tyrosine hydroxylase catalyzes the formation of L-DOPA, the rate-limiting step in the biosynthesis of dopamine, tyrosine hydroxylase-deficiency does not cause Parkinson's disease, but typically gives rise to infantile parkinsonism, although the spectrum extends to a condition resembling dopamine-responsive dystonia.  
A direct pathogenetic role of tyrosine hydroxylase has also been suggested, as the enzyme is a source of H2O2 and other reactive oxygen species (ROS), and a target for radical-mediated injury. It has been demonstrated that L-DOPA is effectively oxidized by mammalian tyrosine hydroxylase, possibly contributing to the cytotoxic effects of L-DOPA. Like other cellular proteins, tyrosine hydroxylase is also a possible target for damaging alterations induced by ROS. This suggests that some of the oxidative damage to tyrosine hydroxylase could be generated by the tyrosine hydroxylase system itself.

Tyrosine hydroxylase can be inhibited by the drug α-methyl-para-tyrosine (metirosine). This inhibition can lead to a depletion of dopamine and norepinepherine in the brain due to the lack of the precursor L-Dopa (L-3,4-dyhydroxyphenylalanine) which is synthesized by tyrosine hydroxylase. This drug is rarely used and can cause depression, but it is useful in treating pheochromocytoma and also resistant hypertension. Older examples of inhibitors mentioned in the literature include oudenone and aquayamycin.

References

Further reading

External links 
  GeneReviews/NIH/NCBI/UW entry on Tyrosine Hydroxylase Deficiency including Tyrosine Hydroxylase-Deficient Dopa-Responsive Dystonia or Segawa Syndrome and Autosomal Recessive Infantile Parkinsonism
 

EC 1.14.16